Dick Flavin may refer to:
 Dick Flavin (Gaelic footballer) (born 1978), Irish Gaelic football player
 Dick Flavin (poet) (1936–2022), American poet